The castra of Brâncovenești was a fort in the Roman province of Dacia in the 2nd and 3rd centuries AD. Its ruins are located in Brâncovenești, Romania.

See also
List of castra

Notes

External links
Roman castra from Romania - Google Maps / Earth

Historic monuments in Mureș County
Roman legionary fortresses in Dacia
Roman legionary fortresses in Romania
Ancient history of Transylvania